Barazin (also Romanized as Barāzīn; also known as Burazi and Burazy) is a village in Bedevostan-e Sharqi Rural District, in the Central District of Heris County, East Azerbaijan Province, Iran. At the 2006 census, its population was 898, in 175 families.

References 

Populated places in Heris County